Nikolay Pavlovich Khlystov (November 10, 1932 in Moscow, Soviet Union – February 14, 1999) was an ice hockey player who played in the Soviet Hockey League.  He played for Krylya Sovetov Moscow.  He was inducted into the Russian and Soviet Hockey Hall of Fame in 1954.

External links
 Russian and Soviet Hockey Hall of Fame bio

1932 births
1999 deaths
Ice hockey players at the 1956 Winter Olympics
Krylya Sovetov Moscow players
Olympic gold medalists for the Soviet Union
Olympic ice hockey players of the Soviet Union
Ice hockey people from Moscow
Olympic medalists in ice hockey
Medalists at the 1956 Winter Olympics